The 1971 Aryamehr Cup was a men's professional tennis tournament played on outdoor clay courts at the Imperial Country Club in Tehran in Iran. The event was part of the 1971 World Championship Tennis circuit. It was the first edition of the tournament and was held from 10 May through 16 May 1971. Marty Riessen won the singles title.

Finals

Singles
 Marty Riessen defeated  John Alexander 6–7, 6–1, 6–3, 7–6

Doubles
 John Newcombe /  Tony Roche defeated  Bob Carmichael /  Ray Ruffels 6–4, 6–7, 6–1

References

External links
ITF tournament edition details

Aryamehr Cup
Aryamehr Cup